Mordoğan is a sea-side township with own municipality in Karaburun district in Turkey's Izmir Province. The town is situated on the eastern shoreline of Karaburun Peninsula within the Gulf of İzmir at about twenty kilometers to the south of the district center of Karaburun. Mordoğan equals the district center in economic development terms, especially in tourism, and has a number of accommodation facilities and restaurants, being advantaged by being located before the district center when coming from İzmir and by being served by a modern and easy land-route.

Gallery

References

Populated coastal places in Turkey
Populated places in İzmir Province
Fishing communities in Turkey
Karaburun District
Towns in Turkey